The Cabinet of Otto Pérez Molina was the forty-eighth cabinet of Guatemala.

The cabinet took office on 14 January 2012 and ended after the resignation of Otto Pérez Molina on 3 September 2015.

Composition

References

Politics of Guatemala
Government of Guatemala